Sean Hastings (born 1969) is an entrepreneur, cypherpunk author, and security expert. He is best known for being the founding CEO of HavenCo, the world's first formal data haven.

Work 
In 1997, Hastings worked on cryptographic protocols and tools free of U.S. cryptographic export restrictions with Vincent Cate, who started the International Conference on Financial Cryptography in Anguilla that same year.

Hastings founded HavenCo in 2000, originally incorporating in his country of residence, Anguilla, before a second incorporation in the Channel Islands. Hastings was the CEO; other co-founders included Ryan Lackey and Sameer Parekh.  Immediately following its public launch, HavenCo was the subject of a great deal of press coverage, including Hastings' appearance, along with several cofounders and the "royal family" of Sealand, on the cover of Wired's July 2000 issue, before the company was entirely nationalised by the government of Sealand in 2002, after commercial failure and mounting tensions.

In 2002, Hastings began work on seasteading with Patri Friedman, a project aimed at building floating communities free from the restrictions of current governments. This collaboration continued through 2009, including a talk by Hastings at the Seasteading Institute's annual conference.

Hastings is the cofounder, with Eric S. Raymond, of Green-Span, an open source infrastructure for trust and reputation management, begun in March 2009.

Hastings is also the author, with Paul Rosenberg, of a book, God Wants You Dead (Vera Verba, 2007) which takes a look at the lighter side of atheism and anarchy, and was executive producer and an actor for The Last Generation to Die a short film about near future immortality technology.

References

External links
Video of Hastings spoofed on the Daily Show with Jon Stewart
 Video with Hastings speaking about living on an extra-national sea platform at 2009 Seasteading conference
 Online and .pdf download of the book "God Wants You Dead" by Sean Hastings and Paul Rosenberg .

1969 births
American computer businesspeople
American libertarians
American atheists
Crypto-anarchists
Cypherpunks
Free software programmers
Living people
Computer security specialists
Principality of Sealand